Wang Chengxiang is a Chinese swimmer who competes in the Men's 400m individual medley. At the 2012 Summer Olympics he finished 14th overall in the heats in the Men's 400 metre individual medley and failed to reach the final.

References

Year of birth missing (living people)
Living people
Chinese male medley swimmers
Swimmers from Shandong
Olympic swimmers of China
Swimmers at the 2012 Summer Olympics
Swimmers at the 2010 Asian Games
Asian Games competitors for China
21st-century Chinese people